Lift, released in 2004, is Sister Hazel's fifth studio album.

Track listing 
"Surrender" (Ken Block, Richard Marx) - 3:44
"Lay It Down" (Block, Ed Roland) - 4:34
"World Inside My Head" (Block, Marx, Sean Mills) - 4:38
"Hold On" (Ryan Newell, Block, Jett Beres)- 3:59
"I Will Come Through" (Block, Sister Hazel) - 4:22
"All About the Love" (Newell, Block, Beres) - 2:59
"In the Moment" (Andrew Copeland, Stan Lynch) - 3:32
"Dreamers" (Block) - 3:27
"Another Me" (Newell, Block, Beres) - 4:02
"Firefly" (Block) - 4:06
"Just What I Needed" (Ric Ocasek) - 4:02
"Erin" (Newell) - 1:57
"Green (Welcome to the World)" (Block, Beres) - 4:54
 The song "Green (Welcome to the World)" ends at 4:03. An untitled hidden track starts at 4:23.

Acoustic versions 

The band also released an EP of acoustic versions of five of the songs: "World Inside My Head," "Hold On," "Firefly," "Another Me," and "All About the Love."

Personnel 
Ken Block - lead vocals, acoustic guitar
Jett Beres - bass, harmony vocals
Andrew Copeland - rhythm guitar, vocals
Ryan Newell - lead and slide guitar, harmony vocals
Mark Trojanowski - drums

References 

2004 albums
Sister Hazel albums